Rap guanine nucleotide exchange factor 1 is a protein that in humans is encoded by the RAPGEF1 gene.

Function 

The protein encoded by this gene is a human guanine nucleotide releasing protein for Ras protein. It belongs to the adaptor-type Src homology (SH)2-containing molecules. Src homology 2 domains are globular protein modules present in a large variety of functionally distinct proteins. They mediate binding events that control the activity and localization of many proteins involved in the transmission of signals from the cell surface to the nucleus. The mRNAs of these proteins are expressed ubiquitously in human adult and fetal tissues. Several alternatively spliced transcript variants of this gene have been described, but the full-length nature of some variants has not been determined.

Interactions 

RAPGEF1 has been shown to interact with:

 BCAR1, 
  CRK,
 CRKL 
 Grb2,  and
 HCK.

References

Further reading

External links 
RAPGEF1 Info with links in the Cell Migration Gateway